James Broad (January 27, 1958 – November 20, 2001) was an American heavyweight boxer who was an amateur star and, prior to the boycott, set to represent America in the 1980 Moscow Olympics. As a pro he won the NABF heavyweight title and was a regular sparring partner of a peak Mike Tyson. He fought the likes of James Smith, Razor Ruddock, Tony Tucker, Tim Witherspoon, Johnny du Plooy, Francesco Damiani, and Greg Page.

Military service
James Broad took up boxing while serving in the U.S. Army, being a Specialist 4th class stationed at Fort Ord.

Amateur career
Broad took up boxing when he joined the army in 1976. He beat Chris McDonald on points, and scored a first-round-knockout victory over Marvis Frazier in the 1980 Olympic Trials finals, where he qualified for the 1980 U.S. Olympic Boxing team which ultimately did not compete due to President Jimmy Carter's order to boycott the Olympics. He also lost a decision to Tony Tubbs.

Highlights

 Interserivce Boxing Championships, Camp Lejeune, North Carolina, April 10, 1980:
Finals: Defeated Stan Butler by decision
 U.S. All-Army Championships, Fort Bragg, North Carolina, March 1980
Finals: Defeated Woody Clark by decision
U.S. Olympic Trials, Atlanta, Georgia, June 1980:
1/4: Defeated Freddy Guzman KO 1 
1/2: Defeated Marvis Frazier KO 1 
Finals: Defeated Chris McDonald by split decision, 3–2

FRG–USA Duals, West Berlin, West Germany, July 1980:
Defeated Peter Hussing (West Germany) RSC 2
Defeated Georg Helm (West Germany) KO 1
 Gold Cup, Nairobi, Kenya, September 1980:
Finals: Defeated Abdallah Kent (Kenya) by decision
USA–Hungary Duals, Rapid City, South Dakota, February 1981:
 Defeated József Réder (Hungary) by decision

Professional career
Nicknamed "Broad-Axe", Broad turned pro in 1981 and put together 12 wins, including a 4th-round knockout of future Heavyweight Champ James "Bonecrusher" Smith. His weight was already a problem at this early stage of his career, but Broad worked down to 228 for his first big fight, against fellow undefeated prospect Marvis Frazier. Broad rocked Frazier with his signature uppercuts but was unable to replicate his knockout victory in the amateurs, and he was outworked over 10 rounds.

Broad bounced back to outpoint Larry Alexander over 12 rounds in 1983 then knockout contender Eddie Gregg in 8 rounds to win the NABF title in 1984. For his first title defense Broad scaled a whopping 261 lbs and was knocked out in 2 rounds by once and future world champion Tim Witherspoon in 1985.

Later years
Broad was unable to get back into serious shape for the remainder of his career, and his results suffered. He lost a 12-round decision to top contender and future world champion Tony Tucker for the USBA title in 1986, and in 1987 was twice outpointed over 10 rounds, by Francesco Damiani in Italy and then by ex-world champ Greg Page, in a fight where both men were down.

Broad outpointed future cruiserweight world title-challenger Patrick Lumumba but went to South Africa and was poleaxed in 4 rounds by Johnny DuPlooy. In his next fight he was stopped on his feet, in questionable circumstances, by rising contender Donovan "Razor" Ruddock. During all this time Broad was a sparring partner for a peak Mike Tyson and took many punches in the gym.

Death
In 1992 Boxing Illustrated reported that Broad intended to make a comeback and wanted to be world champion, despite the fact he was banned in Nevada and California both for failing a neurological exam and testing positive for Hepatitis. He somehow managed to get 4 more fights, losing 3 of them. By 2000 Broad was said to be homeless in Las Vegas and badly brain damaged, and James died in 2001 aged only 43.

Professional boxing record

|-
|align="center" colspan=8|23 Wins (15 knockouts, 8 decisions), 10 Losses (3 knockouts, 7 decisions) 
|-
| align="center" style="border-style: none none solid solid; background: #e3e3e3"|Result
| align="center" style="border-style: none none solid solid; background: #e3e3e3"|OppRecord
| align="center" style="border-style: none none solid solid; background: #e3e3e3"|Opponent
| align="center" style="border-style: none none solid solid; background: #e3e3e3"|Type
| align="center" style="border-style: none none solid solid; background: #e3e3e3"|Round
| align="center" style="border-style: none none solid solid; background: #e3e3e3"|Date
| align="center" style="border-style: none none solid solid; background: #e3e3e3"|Location
| align="center" style="border-style: none none solid solid; background: #e3e3e3"|Notes
|-
|Loss
|
|align=left| Calvin Jones
|MD
|10
|20/08/1993
|align=left| Melrose Park, Illinois, U.S.
|align=left|
|-
|Win
|
|align=left| Philipp Brown
|PTS
|8
|26/06/1993
|align=left| Saint George, Utah, U.S.
|align=left|
|-
|Loss
|
|align=left| Daniel Dăncuță
|UD
|4
|14/02/1993
|align=left| Las Vegas, Nevada, U.S.
|align=left|
|-
|Loss
|
|align=left| Billy Wright
|UD
|6
|06/10/1992
|align=left| Miami Beach, Florida, U.S.
|align=left|
|-
|Win
|
|align=left| Maurice Smith
|TKO
|4
|05/10/1991
|align=left| Vancouver, British Columbia, Canada
|align=left|
|-
|Loss
|
|align=left| Donovan Ruddock
|TKO
|1
|06/12/1988
|align=left| Halifax, Nova Scotia, Canada
|align=left|
|-
|Loss
|
|align=left| Johnny du Plooy
|KO
|4
|27/02/1988
|align=left| Johannesburg, South Africa
|align=left|
|-
|Win
|
|align=left| Patrick Lumumba
|PTS
|10
|01/08/1987
|align=left| Las Vegas, Nevada, U.S.
|align=left|
|-
|Loss
|
|align=left| Greg Page
|MD
|10
|30/05/1987
|align=left| Las Vegas, Nevada, U.S.
|align=left|
|-
|Loss
|
|align=left| Francesco Damiani
|UD
|10
|11/04/1987
|align=left| Bologna, Italy
|align=left|
|-
|Loss
|
|align=left| Tony "TNT" Tucker
|UD
|12
|26/09/1986
|align=left| Atlantic City, New Jersey, U.S.
|align=left|
|-
|Win
|
|align=left| Wesley Smith
|KO
|2
|28/06/1986
|align=left| Troy, New York, U.S.
|align=left|
|-
|Win
|
|align=left| Bobby Crabtree
|KO
|5
|03/05/1986
|align=left| Glens Falls, New York, U.S.
|align=left|
|-
|Win
|
|align=left| Rodney Frazier
|TKO
|1
|25/01/1986
|align=left| Atlantic City, New Jersey, U.S.
|align=left|
|-
|Loss
|
|align=left| "Terrible" Tim Witherspoon
|KO
|2
|29/04/1985
|align=left| Buffalo, New York, U.S.
|align=left|
|-
|Win
|
|align=left| Sterling Benjamin
|TKO
|2
|14/12/1984
|align=left| New York City, U.S.
|align=left|
|-
|Win
|
|align=left| Eddie Gregg
|TKO
|8
|23/08/1984
|align=left| New York City, U.S.
|align=left|
|-
|Win
|
|align=left| Tommy Franco Thomas
|TKO
|3
|03/05/1984
|align=left| Atlantic City, New Jersey, U.S.
|align=left|
|-
|Win
|
|align=left| Larry Alexander
|SD
|12
|17/11/1983
|align=left| Atlantic City, New Jersey, U.S.
|align=left|
|-
|Win
|
|align=left| Leroy Diggs
|TKO
|8
|18/08/1983
|align=left| Atlantic City, New Jersey, U.S.
|align=left|
|-
|Loss
|
|align=left| Marvis Frazier
|UD
|10
|10/04/1983
|align=left| Atlantic City, New Jersey, U.S.
|align=left|
|-
|Win
|
|align=left| Tony Pulu
|KO
|3
|10/03/1983
|align=left| Las Vegas, Nevada, U.S.
|align=left|
|-
|Win
|
|align=left| Walter Santemore
|UD
|12
|06/01/1983
|align=left| Atlantic City, New Jersey, U.S.
|align=left|
|-
|Win
|
|align=left| Donnie Long
|MD
|10
|17/10/1982
|align=left| Atlantic City, New Jersey, U.S.
|align=left|
|-
|Win
|
|align=left| Randy Mack
|TKO
|8
|16/09/1982
|align=left| Atlantic City, New Jersey, U.S.
|align=left|
|-
|Win
|
|align=left| Art Robinson
|DQ
|4
|04/08/1982
|align=left| Atlantic City, New Jersey, U.S.
|align=left|
|-
|Win
|
|align=left| Lonnie Chapman
|KO
|2
|18/07/1982
|align=left| Atlantic City, New Jersey, U.S.
|align=left|
|-
|Win
|
|align=left| Harold Rice
|PTS
|8
|02/04/1982
|align=left| Atlantic City, New Jersey, U.S.
|align=left|
|-
|Win
|
|align=left| Lou Benson, Jr.
|PTS
|8
|11/02/1982
|align=left| Atlantic City, New Jersey, U.S.
|align=left|
|-
|Win
|
|align=left| Robert Evans
|TKO
|6
|17/12/1981
|align=left| Atlantic City, New Jersey, U.S.
|align=left|
|-
|Win
|
|align=left| James "Bonecrusher" Smith
|TKO
|4
|05/11/1981
|align=left| Atlantic City, New Jersey, U.S.
|align=left|
|-
|Win
|
|align=left| Greg Stephany
|KO
|3
|16/09/1981
|align=left| New York City, U.S.
|align=left|
|-
|Win
|
|align=left| Albert Collins
|KO
|1
|11/08/1981
|align=left| Atlantic City, New Jersey, U.S.
|align=left|

References

External links

Olympic team 1980 

1958 births
2001 deaths
African-American boxers
Boxers from North Carolina
Sportspeople from Greensboro, North Carolina
Heavyweight boxers
American male boxers
20th-century African-American sportspeople